This is the discography of American hip-hop artist DJ Drama. His first album, Gangsta Grillz: The Album, was released in December 2007. It contained two singles: "5000 Ones", featuring Nelly, T.I., Yung Joc, Willie the Kid, Young Jeezy, Diddy and Twista, and "The Art of Storytellin' Part 4", featuring OutKast and Marsha Ambrosius. His second album was released two years later. On Gangsta Grillz: The Album (Vol. 2) there were again two singles. The first single is "Day Dreaming", featuring Akon, Snoop Dogg and T.I. The second single of the album is "Ridiculous", featuring Gucci Mane, Yo Gotti, Lonnie Mac and OJ da Juiceman. Both singles weren't as successful as "5000 Ones" in the United States, but "Day Dreaming" did peak at #33 on the New Zealander RIANZ singles chart and at #59 on the Swedish Sverigetopplistan singles chart. In 2011 DJ Drama released his third studio album, Third Power. It was his first album not to be released in the Gangsta Grillz series. The lead single of the album is "Oh My", featuring Fabolous, Roscoe Dash and Wiz Khalifa. It was Drama's first song in the Hot 100. It peaked at #95. Besides it peaked at #18 on the Hot R&B/Hip-Hop Songs and #12 on the Hot Rap Songs. On March 1, 2012 DJ Drama announced the release of his fourth album: Quality Street Music. For the album DJ Drama released a new single: "We in This Bitch", featuring Young Jeezy, T.I., Ludacris and Future. It peaked at #68 on the Hot R&B/Hip-Hop Songs. The next single, "My Moment, featuring 2 Chainz, Meek Mill, & Jeremih, peaked at #89 on the Hot 100 Singles chart, #24 on the Hot R&B/Hip-Hop Songs, and #16 on the Hot Rap Songs. It becomes DJ Drama's most successful single to date.

Studio albums

Singles

As lead artist

As featured artist

Other charted songs

Guest appearances 
2006: "Freak" (Young Buck featuring DJ Drama)
2007: "Long Gone Missin'" (Trey Songz featuring DJ Drama)
2008: "Speedin' (We the Best Remix)" (Rick Ross featuring R. Kelly, DJ Khaled, Plies, Birdman, Busta Rhymes, DJ Drama, Webbie, Gorilla Zoe, Fat Joe, Torch, Gunplay, DJ Bigga Rankin', Flo Rida, Brisco and Lil Wayne)
2010: "Bounce, Rock, Skate (Kurupted Mix)" (Kurupt featuring DJ Drama, DJ Quik, Terrace Martin and Snoop Dogg)
2011: "Silent Assassin" (Dorrough featuring DJ Drama)
2012: "Popped Off" (T.I. featuring Dr. Dre and DJ Drama)
2012: "40-40" (Troy Ave featuring Spot and DJ Drama)
2012: "He's from the A" (Micole featuring The-Dream, Gucci Mane, Roscoe Dash and DJ Drama)
2013: "Tongue Ring" (OverDoz featuring Cheetah Boyz and DJ Drama)
2014: "STN MTN" (Childish Gambino mixtape presented by Gangsta Grillz)
2020: "Bandz Up" (Major League DJz featuring DJ Drama and Nasty C)
2021: Numerous appearances on Tyler, The Creator’s album, "Call Me If You Get Lost"

Music videos

As lead artist

As featured artist

Notes

References 

Hip hop discographies
Discographies of American artists